Alem Merajić (born 4 February 1994) is a Bosnian professional footballer who plays as a left-back for German club AC Milan Heidenheim.

Club career
Starting out in FK Novi Grad Sarajevo and FK Olimpik in his native Sarajevo, Merajić, a youth international, moved in February 2012 to GNK Dinamo Zagreb in Croatia. He returned to  Olimpik that same summer, debuting for the first team in 2013 and becoming a first-team regular in the Premier League of Bosnia and Herzegovina. In May 2015, Merajić was part of the Olimpik team that won the club's first historic Bosnian Cup in the 2014–15 season.

In January 2016 he moved to KF Shkëndija, featuring in the Macedonian First League. He won one another trophy in his career, this time with Shkëndija, the Macedonian Cup in May 2016. 

This stint proved to be short-term as well, as he joined the Prva HNL team RNK Split in August 2016. After leaving Split in July 2017, Merajić came back to Bosnia and signed with FK Radnik Bijeljina. He left Radnik in June 2020 after his contract with the club expired, winning two Republika Srpska Cups during his time at the club.

International career
Merajić represented Bosnia and Herzegovina on various youth levels. He played for the U17, U18, U19 and U21 national teams.

Honours
Olimpik
Bosnian Cup: 2014–15

Shkëndija
Macedonian Cup: 2015–16

Radnik Bijeljina
Republika Srpska Cup: 2017–18, 2018–19

References

External links

1994 births
Living people
Footballers from Sarajevo
Association football fullbacks
Bosnia and Herzegovina footballers
Bosnia and Herzegovina youth international footballers
Bosnia and Herzegovina under-21 international footballers
FK Olimpik players
KF Shkëndija players
RNK Split players
FK Radnik Bijeljina players
Premier League of Bosnia and Herzegovina players
Macedonian First Football League players
Croatian Football League players
Bosnia and Herzegovina expatriate footballers
Expatriate footballers in North Macedonia
Bosnia and Herzegovina expatriate sportspeople in North Macedonia
Expatriate footballers in Croatia
Bosnia and Herzegovina expatriate sportspeople in Croatia
Expatriate footballers in Germany
Bosnia and Herzegovina expatriate sportspeople in Germany